Maidla may refer to several places in Estonia:

Maidla Parish, a municipality in Ida-Viru County
Maidla, Ida-Viru County, a village in Maidla Parish, Ida-Viru County
Maidla, Harju County, a village in Saue Parish, Harju County
Maidla, Juuru Parish, a village in Juuru Parish, Rapla County
Maidla, Märjamaa Parish, a village in Märjamaa Parish, Rapla County

See also
Madila